Antanas Lingis (26 December 1905 – 6 June 1941) was a Lithuanian footballer who played as a forward for LFLS Kaunas and the Lithuania national team. For Lithuania he scored 12 goals in 33 appearances, which at the time was the record number of goals scored by an individual player for Lithuania. The first match he played for Lithuania was on 25 July 1928, a 3–0 loss against Latvia. His last cap was on 11 June 1938, a 2–0 loss against Estonia. At club level, Lingis won the Lithuanian A Lyga four times between 1922 and 1932 with LFLS Kaunas.

External links
 RSSSF: Antanas Lingis - International Goals
 All Lithuanian Team Games 1923–1930

1905 births
1941 deaths
Lithuanian footballers
Association football forwards
Lithuania international footballers